Thiago Braz da Silva (born 16 December 1993) is a Brazilian athlete specializing in the pole vault who holds the Olympic record of 6.03 metres. He won the gold medal at the 2016 Summer Olympics and the bronze medal at the 2020 Summer Olympics.

Career
In 2012, he won the gold medal at the World Junior Championships.

In 2013, he became the South American champion with a new outdoor area record of 5.83 metres. On 24 June 2015, he set a new record of 5.92 metres in Baku, Azerbaijan.

On 13 February 2016, he extended the South American indoor record to 5.93 metres in Berlin, Germany.

On 15 August 2016, at the 2016 Olympic Games in Rio de Janeiro, Thiago Braz da Silva won the gold medal in men's pole vault by beating French pole-vaulter Renaud Lavillenie, the incumbent world record holder and gold medalist in London Olympic Games. In the final, Lavillenie and Braz were the only two athletes to achieve the high of 5.93m, and consequently, they were the only two left to dispute the gold medal. Lavillenie easily cleared the next height, 5.98m, with his first attempt, but da Silva decided to skip 5.98m (as clearing that height would still have left him in silver-medal position on countback) and went on to 6.03m. With a successful second attempt at 6.03m, da Silva set a new Olympic Record. Lavillenie, having failed his first two attempts at 6.03m, attempted 6.08 with his final jump but failed. Thiago Braz da Silva won the gold medal with an Olympic record and surpassed his personal best performance by 10 cm. He was just 1 cm away from matching Brad Walker's Americas record of 6.04 m.

After an Olympic cycle much lower than expected, without medals in World Championships and even in Pan American Games between 2016 and 2020, Braz participated in the 2020 Summer Olympics in Tokyo again without being the favorite, but at the same time, with everyone knowing the possibilities for the Brazilian to win a medal again. At heats, he qualified easily, missing two jumps, but reached the 5.75 mark without needing the third and final attempt at any mark. In the final, he missed an attempt at the 5.70 and 5.80 marks but managed to pass the second time; when he reached 5.87, a mark not so easy to overtake, he beat it on the first attempt, which became crucial to reach the bronze medal. At this point in the race, Renaud Lavillenie, who competed with both feet injured, still had a chance to overtake Braz and gave up from 5.87, passing the bar to 5.92; however, he failed in his attempts and was left without a medal. This ensured Braz on the podium, as only he, the Swede Armand Duplantis, who was the world record holder and favorite for gold, and the American Chris Nilsen, who surprisingly reached 5.97 getting the silver, remained in the race. Braz missed three attempts in the 5.92 and ended up with the bronze. Duplantis easily managed 6.02 and could have tried to break Thiago Braz's Olympic record of 6.03; however, he changed the attempt to 6.19 to beat his own world record of 6.18 but failed. Braz finished with his second consecutive Olympic medal, a very rare feat in Brazilian athletics.

At the 2022 World Athletics Indoor Championships in Belgrade, Serbia, Braz got his first medal in the World Championships, a silver obtained with a jump of 5.95, a new indoor South American record. The gold went to the Swedish Duplantis, who broke the world record there with 6.20. 

At the 2022 World Athletics Championships, Braz obtained the best position in the history of Brazil in the World Championships in the pole vault, finishing in 4th place with a jump of 5.87.

Personal bests
Pole vault (outdoor): 6.03 m –  Rio de Janeiro, Brazil, 15 Aug 2016
Pole vault (indoor): 5.95 m –  Belgrade, Serbia, 20 March 2022

Competition record

iAR = indoor Area Record

References

External links

 

1993 births
Living people
Brazilian male pole vaulters
Athletes (track and field) at the 2010 Summer Youth Olympics
Athletes (track and field) at the 2015 Pan American Games
Athletes (track and field) at the 2019 Pan American Games
Pan American Games athletes for Brazil
World Athletics Championships athletes for Brazil
Athletes (track and field) at the 2016 Summer Olympics
Olympic athletes of Brazil
Medalists at the 2016 Summer Olympics
Medalists at the 2020 Summer Olympics
Olympic bronze medalists for Brazil
Olympic gold medalists for Brazil
Olympic bronze medalists in athletics (track and field)
Olympic gold medalists in athletics (track and field)
Olympic male pole vaulters
Athletes (track and field) at the 2020 Summer Olympics
World Athletics Indoor Championships medalists
Sportspeople from São Paulo (state)
21st-century Brazilian people